The Woman in Me may refer to:

The Woman in Me (album), a 1995 album by Shania Twain
"The Woman in Me (Needs the Man in You)", a song from this album
"The Woman in Me" (Crystal Gayle song), 1981
"The Woman in Me" (Donna Summer song), 1982, covered by Heart in 1994

See also
Woman in Me, a 1997 album by Louise, or its title track
"Woman in Me", a song by Jessica Simpson featuring Destiny's Child from the album Sweet Kisses, 1999